"Unconditional" is a debut song written by Rivers Rutherford, Liz Hengber and Deanna Bryant, and recorded by American country music singer Clay Davidson.  It was released in 2000 as the first single and title track from the album Unconditional.  The song reached the Top 5 on the Billboard Hot Country Singles & Tracks chart, peaking at number 3.  It was his most successful hit single to date.

Content
The song begins with a young man coming home from a bar with "liquor on [his] breath". After an argument with his father about how he must abide by his rules, he leaves saying "I hate you." His father then explains: "You can't stop my love for you / It will be here, that's a given / As long as I am living on this Earth / One thing is true / You can turn away, forget me / Curse my name, but love won't let me let you go / Son, always know / My love is unconditional."

In the second verse, the young man is reflecting on his wife leaving him saying "I hate you" a year later and realizes what his father meant in the first verse. The husband explains the same thing that his father had explained to him — that his love for her is unconditional.

Charts

Weekly charts

Year-end charts

References

2000 songs
2000 debut singles
Clay Davidson songs
Songs written by Deanna Bryant
Songs written by Rivers Rutherford
Songs written by Liz Hengber
Song recordings produced by Scott Hendricks
Virgin Records singles